Satyabodha Tirtha ( - )  was an Indian philosopher, scholar, yogi, mystic and saint. He was the 25th pontiff of Uttaradi Math and served the pontificate from March 1744 - 9 March 1783. Satyabodha Tirtha was a great yogi and was honoured by both Hindu and Muslim rulers of his time. Satyabodha Tirtha enjoyed a good fame as a miracle-man. Almost all the princes of the South India used to worship him and were his ardent disciples. Murari Rao of Gooty, Raghoji Bhosale and Fateh Singh Rao Gaekwad, were his great disciples. Satyabodha Tirtha Swamiji's mission of peace has played a prominent role during this time. He earned a reputation as the greatest of Madhva saints of his time for his un-rivaled scholarship, miraculous achievements and dynamism as the pontiff of the Uttaradi Math. So many were his achievements and so well was he liked, admired and respected by people of all castes and creeds, rich and poor, that the Uttaradi Math (where Satyabodha's Brindavana is present) in Savanur got the name as Satyabodha Math after him.

Biography
Satyabodha Tirtha was born in Raichur which is located between Krishna and Tungabhadra rivers in the Indian state of Karnataka. Most of the information about his life is derived from hagiography: Satyabodha Vijaya written by Kanchi Vadiraj Achar. Born in 1710 into a traditional Deshastha Madhva Brahmin household, he was named Ramacharya. His father name is Hariyacharya and mother name is Aralabai. He was born with Markhandeya rishi amsa. He started studying shastras at the age of 8. The name conferred on him when he became the head of the Uttaradi Math monastery was Satyabodha Tirtha. On assuming the pontificate of the Uttaradi Mutt, he built an excellent Brindavana to his guru at Mana Madurai and performed a great aradhana in his honour. Satyabodha Tirtha travelled extensively all over India winning over adversaries in philosophical scholarly discussions acquiring shishyas and considerable wealth, landed properties and tamrapatras from Kings and Nawabs.

Peace treatise between two Kings
Satyabodha Tirtha has played a prominent part in the history of India. Once it so happened that Murari Rao of Gooty was occupying the Fort of Trichanapalli. Nizam-ul-mulk had put a seize to this fort in order to get back this fort. He was unsuccessful though he tried it for 3 months. Then the Nizam was told that if Satyabodha Swami were brought to Trichanappally from Ramanathpur and kept in jail, Murari Rao who was an ardent devotee would come out of the fort and yield. Satyabodha Tirtha brought about treaties between these two Warring Kings and established peace in the Country.

In culture
Satyabodha Vijaya is a kavya of twentyone sargas written by Kanchi Vadiraj Acharya who was his disciple. The Mahakavya describes Satyabodha's life in detail. He was a saint of marvellous powers, his life is full of thrilling events. Let alone Hindus, even Mohammedans worshipped him with great reverence, Nawab of Ramnad, Nawab of Savanur and many other Muslim princes felt it an honour to be puppets in his hands. There is also another work known as Guru Katha Kalpa Taru which also gives details about Satyabodha.

References

Bibliography

External links
Satyabodha Swamy Math website

Madhva religious leaders
18th-century Indian philosophers
Dvaitin philosophers
Uttaradi Math
Indian Hindu saints
People from Raichur district
People from Raichur